Cheshmeh Gilas (also Romanized as Cheshmeh Gīlās; also known as Chashmeh Gīlāg) is a village in Bizaki Rural District, Golbajar District, Chenaran County, Razavi Khorasan Province, Iran. At the 2006 census, its population was 188, in 51 families.

References 

Populated places in Chenaran County